Domitian of Huy (also, of Maestricht) was a Gaulish bishop of the sixth century who is noted for both his generosity and writings against heresy. He is venerated as a saint.

Life
Domitian was chosen bishop of Tongeren, but later moved his see to Maastricht. He was present at the Council of Clermont (535). Domitian is notable for speaking out convincingly against heretics, especially at the Fifth Council of Orléans in 549.

He encouraged the development of polemic against heresy in the early church, and worked to evangelize the Meuse Valley. He is occasionally referred to as the "Apostle of the Meuse Valley" for his efforts there.

Domitian also constructed churches and hospices in order to care for people spiritually and physically. He was well known for his generosity, as well as his ability to procure money via fund-raising, a talent that once helped to ease a famine in his bishopric.

Veneration
Domitian's relics are kept and venerated at the Church of Notre-Dame in Huy, Belgium, the city of which he is now the patron saint. He is also invoked against fevers.

References

Sources

Year of birth unknown
560 deaths
6th-century Christian saints
Belgian Roman Catholic saints
6th-century Frankish bishops
Huy